Kiss Ikons is a four-CD box set featuring material recorded by the original members of the American hard rock band Kiss. It was released in 2008 by Universal Music Group.

Background
Each CD in the set is named after one of the original group members (which contain songs that they wrote/sing on), created by long-time Kiss fan Paul "DJ Flare" Hall and co-produced with Jeff Fura. In 1996, the 'KISS-Icons' logos were created by Ajax Garcia, a famous Los Angeles-based artist. Garcia is known as a founding member of the 1990s punk group The Napoleon Blownaparts.

Track listing

References

External links
 NEW KISS CD SET at KissOnline.com

Kiss (band) compilation albums
2008 greatest hits albums